Aretha is the thirty-first studio album by American singer Aretha Franklin, originally released on October 27, 1986 by Arista Records. It is the third album with the Aretha title to be released by Franklin, following her 1961 album and 1980 album.

Background
As with Franklin's previous album, Who's Zoomin' Who?, Aretha was produced mainly by Narada Michael Walden and includes her duet with George Michael, "I Knew You Were Waiting (For Me)", which became Franklin's first #1 Pop single since "Respect" in 1967, and would also be her last. The album also yielded three other hit singles: "Jimmy Lee", "Rock-A-Lott" and a hard rock cover of The Rolling Stones' classic, "Jumpin' Jack Flash". All music videos were extremely popular on MTV, BET and other video outlets.

Franklin's vocal from "Rock-A-Lott" was sampled extensively in the 49ers' 1990 hit "Touch Me", while her version of "Jumpin' Jack Flash" was the title song for the comedy film of the same name starring Whoopi Goldberg. All four of the singles were shot as music videos that received extensive play.

The album cover was Andy Warhol's final work before his death in early 1987.

The album was remastered and re-released as an "Expanded Edition" in December 2014 by Funky Town Grooves, with bonus tracks and a second CD of material.

Commercial performance
Following Franklin's first-ever Platinum record, Who's Zoomin' Who?, Aretha was certified Gold by the RIAA, after only several weeks on the market, with no additional certification added.

This marked Franklin's seventh Gold album.

Track listing

Personnel

Musicians
 Aretha Franklin – lead vocals, acoustic piano (4)
 George Michael – lead vocals (2)
 Larry Graham – lead vocals (8)
 Walter Afanasieff – acoustic piano (1), synthesizers (1-3, 5, 6), Moog synth bass (2), programming (2, 3), keyboards (8)
 David Sancious – synthesizers (1), harp (3), synth horns (5)
 Chuck Leavell – keyboards (4)
 Nick Johnson – keyboards (7)
 Nat Adderley Jr. – keyboards (9)
 Corrado Rustici – Charvel MIDI guitar synthesizer (1, 2, 5), guitar (8)
 Keith Richards – lead guitar (4)
 Allen Rogan – guitar (4)
 Ronnie Wood – guitar (4)
 Vernon "Ice" Black – guitar (6)
 Teddy White – rhythm guitar (6)
 Greg Porée – guitar (7)
 David T. Walker – guitar (7)
 Doc Powell – guitar (9)
 Randy Jackson – acoustic bass (1), bass guitar (2-4, 6, 8), Moog bass (5)
 James Jamerson, Jr. – bass guitar (7)
 Francisco Centeno – bass guitar (9)
 Narada Michael Walden – drums (1-3, 5, 6, 8), acoustic piano intro (1), programming (6), percussion (8)
 Steve Jordan – drums (4)
 James Gadson – drums (7)
 Yogi Horton – drums (9)
 Preston Glass – drum programming (2), percussion (2), bells (3), keyboards (8)
 Gigi Gonaway – tambourine (2), percussion (2, 5), timbales (5), backing vocals (5)
 Jason Martin – cymbal (5)
 Paul Rekow – congas (6), shekere (6)
 Orestes Vilato – timbales (6), cowbell (6)
 Daryl "Munyungo" Jackson – percussion (7)
 Kenny G – tenor saxophone (1)
 Marc Russo – alto saxophone (1)
 Eddie Mininfield – tenor saxophone (5)
 David Wallace – trombone (1)
 Jerry Hey – trumpet (1), horn arrangement (1), string arrangement (2, 3, 6, 8)
 Ernie Fields, Jr. – horns (7)
 Charles Veal – strings (7)
 Sanford Allen – strings (9)
 Gil Askey – horn, rhythm and string arrangements (7); conductor (7)
 Paul Riser – horn, rhythm and string arrangements (9)
 Kitty Beethoven – backing vocals (2, 5, 6)
 Kevin Dorsey – backing vocals (2, 3, 5, 6)
 Jim Gilstrap – backing vocals (2, 3, 5, 6)
 Jennifer Hall – backing vocals (2, 3, 5, 6)
 Myrna Matthews – backing vocals (2, 3, 6)
 Claytoven Richardson – backing vocals (2, 5)
 Jeanie Tracy – backing vocals (2, 3, 6)
 Ortheia Barnds – backing vocals (4)
 Margaret Branch – backing vocals (4, 7)
 Brenda Corbett – backing vocals (4, 7)
 Dana Joe Chappelle – backing vocals (5)
 Janice Lee – backing vocals (5)
 Cynthia Shiloh – backing vocals (5)
 Anukampa Walden – backing vocals (5)
 Liz Jackson – backing vocals (6)
 Esther Ridgeway – backing vocals (7)
 Gloria Ridgeway – backing vocals (7)

Production
  Producers – Narada Michael Walden (tracks 1-3, 5 & 6); Keith Richards (track 4); Aretha Franklin (tracks 7 & 9).
  Recording engineers – David Frazier (tracks 1-3, 5 & 6); Steve Lillywhite (track 4); Russ Terrana (track 7); Jim Dougherty (track 9).
 Assistant engineer – Dana Jon Chappelle 
 Additional assistant engineers – Maureen Droney, Mike Iacopelli, Gordon Lyon, Jim "Watts" Vereecke and Lenette Viegas.
 Additional engineers – Dana Jon Chappelle (track 2 & 5); Maureen Droney (track 2); Gordon Lyon (track 3); Mike Iacopelli (track 4); Mark Roule (track 9).
 Mixing – David Frazier (tracks 1-6 & 8); Mike Iacopelli (track 7 & 9).
 Vocal engineer (track 7 & 9) – Mike Iacopelli
 Recording studios – Tarpan Recording Studios (San Rafael, CA); The Plant Studios (Los Angeles, CA); The Automatt (San Francisco, CA); Studio "D" (Sausalito, CA); Motown Recording Studios (Hollywood, CA); Sigma Sound Studios (New York, NY); Electric Lady Studios (New York, NY); United Sound Systems (Detroit, Michigan).

Artwork
 Art direction – Steven Shmerler
 Design and layout – Maude Gilman
 Photography – John Pinderhughes
 Front cover art and line drawings – Andy Warhol

Charts

References

External links
 Aretha (1986) at Discogs
 

1986 albums
Aretha Franklin albums
Arista Records albums
Albums produced by Narada Michael Walden
Albums with cover art by Andy Warhol